Lead(II) sulfide (also spelled sulphide) is an inorganic compound with the formula PbS. Galena is the principal ore and the most important compound of lead. It is a semiconducting material with niche uses.

Formation, basic properties, related materials
Addition of hydrogen sulfide or sulfide salts to a solution containing a lead salt, such as PbCl2, gives a black precipitate of lead sulfide. 
 Pb2+  +  H2S  →  PbS↓  +  2 H+

This reaction is used in qualitative inorganic analysis. The presence of hydrogen sulfide or sulfide ions may be tested using "lead acetate paper."

Like the related materials PbSe and PbTe, PbS is a semiconductor. In fact, lead sulfide was one of the earliest materials to be used as a semiconductor. Lead sulfide crystallizes in the sodium chloride motif, unlike many other IV-VI semiconductors.

Since PbS is the main ore of lead, much effort has focused on its conversion.  A major process involves smelting of PbS followed by reduction of the resulting oxide.  Idealized equations for these two steps are:
 2 PbS + 3 O2  →  2 PbO  +  2 SO2
 PbO  +  C  →  Pb  +  CO

The sulfur dioxide is converted to sulfuric acid.

Nanoparticles 
Lead sulfide-containing nanoparticle and quantum dots have been well studied. Traditionally, such materials are produced by combining lead salts with a variety of sulfide sources. In 2009, PbS nanoparticles have been examined for use in solar cells.

Applications

PbS was one of the first materials used for electrical diodes that could detect electromagnetic radiation, including infrared light. As an infrared sensor, PbS directly detects light, as opposed to thermal detectors, which respond to a change in detector element temperature caused by the radiation.  A PbS element can be used to measure radiation in either of two ways: by measuring the tiny photocurrent the photons cause when they hit the PbS material, or by measuring the change in the material's electrical resistance that the photons cause. Measuring the resistance change is the more commonly used method. At room temperature, PbS is sensitive to radiation at wavelengths between approximately 1 and 2.5 μm. This range corresponds to the shorter wavelengths in the infra-red portion of the spectrum, the so-called short-wavelength infrared (SWIR). Only very hot objects emit radiation in these wavelengths.

Cooling the PbS elements, for example using liquid nitrogen or a Peltier element system, shifts its sensitivity range to between approximately 2 and 4 μm. Objects that emit radiation in these wavelengths still have to be quite hot—several hundred degrees Celsius—but not as hot as those detectable by uncooled sensors. (Other compounds used for this purpose include indium antimonide (InSb) and mercury-cadmium telluride (HgCdTe), which have somewhat better properties for detecting the longer IR wavelengths.)  The high dielectric constant of PbS leads to relatively slow detectors (compared to silicon, germanium, InSb, or HgCdTe).

Planetary science
Elevations above 2.6 km (1.63 mi) on the planet Venus are coated with a shiny substance. Though the composition of this coat is not entirely certain, one theory is that Venus "snows" crystallized lead sulfide much as Earth snows frozen water. If this is the case, it would be the first time the substance was identified on a foreign planet. Other less likely candidates for Venus' "snow" are bismuth sulfide and tellurium.

Safety
Lead(II) sulfide is so insoluble that it is almost nontoxic, but pyrolysis of the material, as in smelting, gives dangerous fumes. Lead sulfide is insoluble and a stable compound in the pH of blood and so is probably one of the less toxic forms of lead. A large safety risk occurs in the synthesis of PbS using lead carboxylates, as they are particularly soluble and can cause negative physiological conditions.

References

Cited sources

External links

 Case Studies in Environmental Medicine (CSEM): Lead Toxicity
 ToxFAQs: Lead
 National Pollutant Inventory – Lead and Lead Compounds Fact Sheet

Lead(II) compounds
Sulfides
IV-VI semiconductors
Infrared sensor materials
Rock salt crystal structure